UEFA Euro 1988 was a football tournament that took place in West Germany between 10 June and 25 June 1988. The eight competing nations were required to name a squad of no more than 20 players. The players' listed ages are their ages on the tournament's opening day (10 June 1988).

Group 1

Denmark
Manager:  Sepp Piontek

Italy
Manager: Azeglio Vicini

Spain
Manager: Miguel Muñoz

West Germany
Manager: Franz Beckenbauer

Group 2

England
Manager: Bobby Robson

Netherlands
Manager: Rinus Michels

Republic of Ireland
Manager:  Jack Charlton

Soviet Union
Manager: Valeriy Lobanovskyi

External links
RSSSF

1988
Squads